is the ninth single by Japanese singer Hiroko Moriguchi, released on February 5, 1991 under Starchild Records. Written by Yui Nishiwaki and Yoko Orihara, the song was used as the ending theme of the 1991 mecha anime film Mobile Suit Gundam F91. The single peaked at No. 9 on Oricon's singles charts and landed at No. 47 on Oricon's 1991 year-ending chart, making it Moriguchi's best-selling single. It was also certified Gold by the RIAJ. In addition, the song led to her debut on NHK's Kōhaku Uta Gassen that year.

In 2018, the song was ranked No. 3 on NHK's . Moriguchi re-recorded the song in 2015 for her 30th anniversary single "; this version is featured in the 2019 album Gundam Song Covers. "Kimi wo Mitsumete -The Time I'm Seeing You-", the B-side, was ranked No. 3 on a 2020 poll hosted by King Records and was re-recorded by Moriguchi for the album Gundam Song Covers 2.

Track listing
All music is arranged by Satoshi Kadokura.

Chart position

Certification

Cover versions 
 Mikuni Shimokawa covered the song in her 2003 compilation Review ~Shimokawa Mikuni Seishun Anison Cover Album~ and her 2007 compilation Reprise: Shimokawa Mikuni Anison Best.
 Shoko Nakagawa covered the song in her 2007 album Shokotan Cover Cover: Anison ni Ai o Komete!!.
 Yumi Matsuzawa covered the song in her 2007 album Anicapella.
 Hisayo Mochizuki covered the song in 2007 Aniplex compilation album Hyakkaseiran: Josei Seiyū-hen.
 Ami Numakura covered the song in the 2009 compilation album THE IDOLM@STER RADIO Uta Dojo.
 Aki Misato covered the song in the 2009 compilation album Gundam Tribute from Lantis.
 Kumi Sakuma and Ryoka Yuzuki covered the song in the 2010 Aniplex compilation album Shin Hyakkaseiran: Josei Seiyū-hen.
 Rasmus Faber covered the song in his 2013 album Rasmus Faber Presents Platinum Jazz-Anime Standard-Vol.4.
 Nami Tamaki covered the song in her 2014 album NT Gundam Cover.
 SawanoHiroyuki[nZk]:Tielle covered the song as a bonus track in the 2016 soundtrack album Mobile Suit Gundam Unicorn RE:0096 Complete Best Limited Edition.
 Lia covered the song in her 2018 album REVIVES -Lia Sings beautiful anime songs-.
 Spira Spica covered the song for their 2019 EP Re:RISE -e.p.-.

References

External links 
 
 
 

1991 singles
1991 songs
Hiroko Moriguchi songs
Gundam songs
Japanese-language songs
King Records (Japan) singles